President Barclay may refer to:

 Arthur Barclay (1854–1938), 15th president of Liberia
 Edwin Barclay (1882–1955), 18th president of Liberia

See also
 Barclay (surname)